Eupithecia convexa is a moth in the family Geometridae. It is found in Taiwan and Thailand.

References

Moths described in 1988
convexa
Moths of Asia